{{DISPLAYTITLE:C7H6N2O5}}
The molecular formula C7H6N2O5 (molar mass: 198.13 g/mol) may refer to:

 3-Amino-5-nitrosalicylic acid
 2,4-Dinitroanisole
 Dinitro-ortho-cresol